Fábio Zambiasi (2 July 1966 – 7 February 2022) was a Brazilian professional footballer who played as a defender for Coritiba, scoring 18 goals in 144 games between 1995 and 1997. Zambiasi died on 7 February 2022, at the age of 55.

Career
Having started his career with Grêmio Santanense in his native Brazil, Zambiasi moved to Germany to sign with 2. Bundesliga team 1. FC Saarbrücken in 1993. On returning to Brazil, Zambiasi played for a number of teams before settling in Soledade, where he continued to play amateur football.

References

1966 births
2022 deaths
Brazilian footballers
Association football defenders
2. Bundesliga players
1. FC Saarbrücken players
Coritiba Foot Ball Club players
América Futebol Clube (SP) players
Avaí FC players
Iraty Sport Club players
Associação Atlética Portuguesa (Santos) players
Esporte Clube São José players
Brazilian expatriate footballers
Brazilian expatriate sportspeople in Germany
Expatriate footballers in Germany
Grêmio Foot-Ball Santanense players
Accidental deaths in Brazil
Sportspeople from Rio Grande do Sul